Når katten er ude is a 1947 Danish family film directed by Lau Lauritzen Jr. and Alice O'Fredericks.

Cast
Karl Gustav Ahlefeldt 
Svend Asmussen as Bent
Ludvig Brandstrup
Rasmus Christiansen
Ellen Feldmann
Betty Helsengreen
Sigurd Langberg
Alexander Larsen
Buster Larsen as Tyven
Henry Madsen as Havemand
Tao Michaëlis as Student Hansen
Gerda Neumann as Nete
Ulrik Neumann as Jørgen
Marie Niedermann
Henry Nielsen
Bodil Steen

References

External links

1947 films
1947 comedy films
Danish comedy films
1940s Danish-language films
Danish black-and-white films
Films directed by Lau Lauritzen Jr.
Films directed by Alice O'Fredericks